Operation Griffin was an ambush organised by a squad of Portuguese paratroopers in southern Guinea to prevent the penetration of guerrillas from Guinea-Conacri into Portuguese controlled areas.

References

External links
  Colonial War 1961-1974

Portuguese Colonial War